18,19-Dehydrobuprenorphine (HS-599) is a  derivative of buprenorphine.  It has about twice the potency of buprenorphine. It has produced a long-lasting antinociceptive response in animal tests.

18,19-Dehydrobuprenorphine never induced conditioned place-preference in test animals, unlike buprenorphine and morphine.

18,19-Dehydrobuprenorphine has about three times higher affinity for the μ-opioid receptor but lower  affinity for δ- and κ-opioid receptors when compared with buprenorphine.

References

Oripavines
Semisynthetic opioids
4,5-Epoxymorphinans